William M. Burke (born 1943) is an American photographer and educator known for his 20 years of documentary photography in Vietnam and neighboring countries, detailing the effects of war.

Biography 
William M. Burke was born in 1943 in Derby, Connecticut. In 1966, he received a B.A. degree in Art History from Middlebury College. He continued studies at Rhode Island School of Design (RISD), and received a B.F.A degree in 1968 and a MFA degree in 1970, while studying with photographer Harry Callahan.

In 1971, he started teaching at the School of the Museum of Fine Arts in Boston. In 1978, he became a Guggenheim fellow in photography.

His work is included in many public collections including the Smithsonian American Art Museum (SAAM), San Francisco Museum of Modern Art (MoMA), Princeton University Art Museum, Museum of Modern Art (MoMA), Museum of Fine Arts, Boston, among others.

Publications

References 

1943 births
Middlebury College alumni
Rhode Island School of Design alumni
School of the Museum of Fine Arts at Tufts faculty
People from Derby, Connecticut
Artists from Boston
Living people